Rebecca Jane Wood (born 8 August 1987) is a New Zealand rugby union player. She made her debut for the Black Ferns in the 2017 International Women's Rugby Series against Australia. She was selected for the Black Ferns squad to the 2017 Women's Rugby World Cup.

Wood is a firefighter by profession.

References

External links 
 Rebecca Wood at Black Ferns

1987 births
Living people
New Zealand women's international rugby union players
New Zealand female rugby union players
New Zealand firefighters